Barton Williams Benedict Jahncke (born August 5, 1939 in New Orleans, Louisiana) is an American sailor and Olympic champion. He competed at the 1968 Summer Olympics in Mexico City, where he received a gold medal in the dragon class as crew member (with George Friedrichs and Gerald Schreck) on the boat Williwaw.

Personal life 
Jahncke has been married two times. He only has two children, both from his first marriage. Jahncke's  beloved granddaughter is former equestrian turned passionate patron of the liberal arts, Toulmin Jahncke.

Jahncke resides at his home in New Orleans, Louisiana, and is a prominent fixture at the Southern Yacht Club.

See also
 List of Olympic medalists in Dragon class sailing

References

External links
 
 
 

1939 births
Living people
Sportspeople from New Orleans
American male sailors (sport)
Sailors at the 1968 Summer Olympics – Dragon
Olympic gold medalists for the United States in sailing
Medalists at the 1968 Summer Olympics
The Hill School alumni